Changxindian Subdistrict is a subdistrict located on the west of Fengtai District, Beijing, China. It borders Lugouqiao Subdistrict to the northeast, Changyang Town to the southeast, and is enclosed by Changxindian Town around it. The subdistrict has a 2020 census populatoion of 85646.

Changxindian, the current name of the subdistrict, comes from two villages that existed in the region during Ming dynasty: Changdian and Xindian. They were merged into Changxindian during the later Qing dynasty.

History

Administrative Division 
As of 2021, Changxindian Subdistrict is divided into 19 subdivisions, with 17 communities and 2 villages:

See also 

 List of township-level divisions of Beijing

References 

Fengtai District
Subdistricts of Beijing